Viktor Yuryevich Pimushin (born 29 April 1955) is a Russian retired professional footballer. He made his professional debut in the Soviet Second League in 1977 for FC Spartak Kostroma.

References

1955 births
People from Dzerzhinsky, Moscow Oblast
Living people
Soviet footballers
Russian footballers
Russian Premier League players
Russian expatriate footballers
Expatriate footballers in Germany
FC Torpedo Moscow players
FC Fakel Voronezh players
FC Baltika Kaliningrad players
Association football forwards
FC Spartak Kostroma players
Sportspeople from Moscow Oblast